The 2012 Championship League Darts was the fifth edition of a darts competition — the Championship League Darts. The competition was organised and held by the Professional Darts Corporation, with the 2012 edition having a prize fund over £200,000.

The format of the tournament is similar to the Premier League Darts tournament, also organized by the PDC, except it is contested by a larger pool of players who were divided into a number of groups.

Every match could be watched on one of the fifty-three bookmaker websites who broadcast the competition. The tournament was available globally through the internet, except in the United States of America where it could not be shown for legal reasons.

Phil Taylor won his third Championship League title be defeating Simon Whitlock 6–4 in the final.

Format
The first group consisted of the top eight players from the PDC Order of Merit who were available for the competition. These eight players played each other over the course of a day, receiving two points for each win. All matches were contested over a maximum of 11 legs with a player winning the match on reaching 6 legs. After all players had played each other, the four players with the most points progressed to the semi-finals with the winners of those matches progressing into the final.

The winner of the final progressed to the winners group which took place at the end of the competition. The runner-up, losing semi-finalists and the players finishing fifth and sixth moved into group two, where they were joined by the next three players in the Order of Merit. The format of the second group was the same as the first group with players moving into the third group. In total there were 8 groups before the final group took place.

This format ensures that all players who do not win the group or finish in the last two positions have another chance to qualify for the winners group.

Prize money
The Championship League Darts awards prize money per leg won, as well as to the eventual winner, runner-up and semi-finalists of the entire tournament. The amount of prize money awarded per leg won is:

The amount of prize money awarded to the winner, runner-up and semi-finalists of the tournament is:

Tournament dates
The tournament took place over nine days throughout September, October and November 2012. One group was played on each day. The dates were as follows:

Group 1 – Tuesday September 25
Group 2 – Wednesday September 26
Group 3 – Thursday September 27
Group 4 – Tuesday October 16
Group 5 – Wednesday October 17
Group 6 – Thursday October 18
Group 7 – Tuesday October 30
Group 8 – Wednesday October 31
Winners Group – Thursday November 1

The tournament took place at the Crondon Park Golf Club in Essex.

Group 1

 Phil Taylor
 Adrian Lewis
 James Wade
 Gary Anderson
 Wes Newton
 Andy Hamilton
 Simon Whitlock
 Terry Jenkins

Group 2

 Phil Taylor
 Adrian Lewis
 Gary Anderson
 Simon Whitlock
 Terry Jenkins
 Mark Webster
 Justin Pipe
 Kevin Painter

Group 3

 Phil Taylor
 Adrian Lewis
 Gary Anderson
 Simon Whitlock
 Terry Jenkins
 Dave Chisnall
 Ronnie Baxter
 Mark Walsh

Group 4

 Phil Taylor
 Simon Whitlock
 Terry Jenkins
 Dave Chisnall
 Mark Walsh
 Paul Nicholson
 Vincent van der Voort
 Mervyn King
 Andy Smith

Group 5

 Simon Whitlock
 Terry Jenkins
 Dave Chisnall
 Mark Walsh
 Paul Nicholson
 Colin Lloyd
 Robert Thornton
 Wayne Jones

Group 6

 Terry Jenkins
 Dave Chisnall
 Mark Walsh
 Paul Nicholson
 Robert Thornton
 Jamie Caven
 John Part
 Colin Osborne

Group 7

 Mark Walsh
 Paul Nicholson
 Robert Thornton
 Jamie Caven
 Colin Osborne
 Michael van Gerwen
 Brendan Dolan
 Richie Burnett

Group 8

 Mark Walsh
 Paul Nicholson
 Robert Thornton
 Michael van Gerwen
 Brendan Dolan
 Denis Ovens
 Peter Wright
 Steve Beaton

Note: Raymond van Barneveld chose not to compete in the tournament. Vincent van der Voort withdrew due to medical issues, Andy Smith will take his place in group 4 with Steve Beaton taking up the new final spot in group 8.

Winners Group

 Wes Newton
 Justin Pipe
 Ronnie Baxter
 Phil Taylor
 Simon Whitlock
 Dave Chisnall
 Jamie Caven
 Mark Walsh

Group stage

Group 1
Played Tuesday September 25, group 1 was won by Wes Newton who qualifies for the winners group. Andy Hamilton and James Wade were knocked out.

Group 2
Played Wednesday September 26, group 2 was won by Justin Pipe who qualifies for the winners group. Mark Webster and Kevin Painter were knocked out.

Group 3
Played Thursday September 27, group 3 was won by Ronnie Baxter who qualifies for the winners group. Adrian Lewis and Gary Anderson were knocked out.

Group 4
Played Tuesday October 16, group 4 was won by Phil Taylor who qualifies for the winners group. Andy Smith and Mervyn King were knocked out.

Group 5
Played Wednesday October 17, was won by Simon Whitlock who qualifies for the winners group. Colin Lloyd and Wayne Jones were knocked out.

Group 6
Played Thursday October 18, was won by Dave Chisnall who qualifies for the winners group. John Part and Terry Jenkins were knocked out.

Group 7
Played Tuesday October 30, was won by Jamie Caven who qualifies for the winners group. Richie Burnett and Colin Osborne were knocked out.

Group 8
Played Wednesday October 31, group 8 was won by Mark Walsh who qualifies for the winners group.

Winners group
Played Thursday November 1, and was won by Phil Taylor.

References

External links
Official website

Championship League Darts
Championship League
Championship League Darts